Extreme commuting is commuting that takes more than daily walking time of an average human. United States Census Bureau defines this as a daily journey to work that takes more than 90 minutes each way.  According to the bureau, about 3% of American adult workers are so-called "extreme" commuters. The number of extreme commuters in the New York, Baltimore–Washington, San Francisco Bay Area, and Los Angeles metropolitan areas is much greater than the national average.

Midas sponsored an "America's Longest Commute" award in 2006. The winner, from Mariposa, California, drove a 372-mile roundtrip (about 7 hours) to and from work in San Jose each day.

United Kingdom
A survey over 2,000 British workers by Randstad Holding revealed that 9% of British workers commute for over 90 minutes each way. 7.5% of the Survey's correspondents worked during their commute, with 18% of them believing that smartphones and tablets have made this easier.

A BBC article in 2013 highlighted multiple reasons for extreme commutes, including lifestyle choice (living in the country and pursuing a London career), relocation of employers, and people increasing their search area when looking for work after redundancy.

See also
 Reverse commute

References

External links
 "There and Back Again: The Soul of the Commuter" (from The New Yorker)
 "Extreme Commuting : More workers are willing to travel three hours a day. But what is the long-term cost?" (from BusinessWeek)
 "Think your commute is tough?" (from USA Today)
 "Extreme Commuting: Is It For You?" (from Investopedia)

Commuting
Society of the United States
Superlatives